The 30th CARIFTA Games was held in Bridgetown, Barbados, on April 14–16, 2001.    An appraisal of the results has been given on the occasion of 40th anniversary of the games, and on the IAAF website.

Participation (unofficial)

Detailed result lists can be found both on the CFPI and on the "World Junior Athletics History" website.  An unofficial count yields the number of about 382 athletes (220 junior (under-20) and 162 youth (under-17)) from about 23 countries:  Antigua and Barbuda (7), Aruba (4), Bahamas (39), Barbados (54), Bermuda (11), British Virgin Islands (4), Cayman Islands (14), Dominica (7), French Guiana (1), Grenada (32), Guadeloupe (20), Guyana (6), Haiti (1), Jamaica (61), Martinique (36), Netherlands Antilles (5), Saint Kitts and Nevis (3), Saint Lucia (10), Saint Vincent and the Grenadines (4), Suriname (3), Trinidad and Tobago (47), Turks and Caicos Islands (7), US Virgin Islands (6).

Records

It is reported that a total of 9 games records were set.  However, the reporting for the two relay records might be disputable.
 
In his first year as a junior. Darrel Brown from Trinidad and Tobago finished the 100 metres in 10.24s (wind: 0.0 m/s).  Further records in the boys' U-20 category were established by Damion Barry, also from Trinidad and Tobago, in 46.51s over 400 metres, and Damon Thompson from Barbados jumping 2.20m high.  It is stated that the Trinidad and Tobago 4 × 100 metres relay team winning in 40.19s also set a new games record, but this is not marked as a record in the published results.
Moreover, two other sources list faster times of 39.87s for Jamaica at the 1997 CARIFTA Games, and 40.03s at the 1998 CARIFTA Games.

In the girls' U-20 category, Veronica Campbell from Jamaica improved her own mark for 200 metres from the year before to 22.93 seconds (wind: -1.6 m/s). Melaine Walker from Jamaica achieved 56.90s in 400 metres hurdles.
 
In the boys' U-17 category, two new records were set: by Kern Harripersad from Trinidad and Tobago in 1:55.20 for 800 metres, and by Jamaican Patrick Lee finishing the 100 metres hurdles in 13.20s (wind: -2.3 m/s).

Finally, in the girls' U-20 category, it is also stated that the Jamaican 4 × 100 metres relay team winning in 45.44s set a new games record. Again, this is not marked as a record in the published results, and two other sources list a faster time of 45.16s for Jamaica at the 1999 CARIFTA Games,

Austin Sealy Award

The Austin Sealy Trophy for the most outstanding athlete of the games was awarded to Veronica Campbell from Jamaica.  She won 3 gold medals (100m, 200m, and 4 × 100m relay) in the junior (U-20) category.

Medal summary
Medal winners are published by category: Boys under 20 (Junior), Girls under 20 (Junior), Boys under 17 (Youth), and Girls under 17 (Youth).
Complete results can be found on the CFPI and the "World Junior Athletics History"
website.

Boys under 20 (Junior)

: Open event for both junior and youth athletes.

Girls under 20 (Junior)

: Open event for both junior and youth athletes.

Boys under 17 (Youth)

Girls under 17 (Youth)

Medal table (unofficial)

References

External links
World Junior Athletics History

CARIFTA Games
2001 in Barbadian sport
CARIFTA
2001 in Caribbean sport
International athletics competitions hosted by Barbados